In mathematics and signal processing, the Hilbert transform  is a specific singular integral that takes a function,  of a real variable and produces another function of a real variable . The Hilbert transform is given by the Cauchy principal value of the convolution with the function   (see ).  The Hilbert transform has a particularly simple representation in the frequency domain: It imparts a phase shift of ±90° ( radians) to every frequency component of a function, the sign of the shift depending on the sign of the frequency  (see ).  The Hilbert transform is important in signal processing, where it is a component of the analytic representation of a real-valued signal .  The Hilbert transform was first introduced by David Hilbert in this setting, to solve a special case of the Riemann–Hilbert problem for analytic functions.

Definition 
Because  is not integrable across , the integral defining the convolution does not always converge. Instead, the Hilbert transform is defined using the Cauchy principal value (denoted here by ). Explicitly, the Hilbert transform of a function (or signal)  is given by

provided this integral exists as a principal value. Alternatively, by changing variables, the principal value integral can be written explicitly as

When the Hilbert transform is applied twice in succession to a function , the result is:

provided the integrals defining both iterations converge in a suitable sense. In particular, the inverse transform is 
.

For an analytic function in the upper half-plane, the Hilbert transform describes the relationship between the real part and the imaginary part of the boundary values.

Notation
Furthermore, many sources define the Hilbert transform as the negative of the one defined here.

History 
The Hilbert transform arose in Hilbert's 1905 work on a problem Riemann posed concerning analytic functions, which has come to be known as the Riemann–Hilbert problem. Hilbert's work was mainly concerned with the Hilbert transform for functions defined on the circle. Some of his earlier work related to the Discrete Hilbert Transform dates back to lectures he gave in Göttingen. The results were later published by Hermann Weyl in his dissertation. Schur improved Hilbert's results about the discrete Hilbert transform and extended them to the integral case. The Hilbert transform was a motivating example for Antoni Zygmund and Alberto Calderón during their study of singular integrals. Their investigations have played a fundamental role in modern harmonic analysis. Various generalizations of the Hilbert transform, such as the bilinear and trilinear Hilbert transforms are still active areas of research today.

Relationship with the Fourier transform 
The Hilbert transform is a multiplier operator. Therefore:

where  denotes the Fourier transform.

By Euler's formula,

The signal is negated; i.e., because

Table of selected Hilbert transforms 
In the following table, the frequency parameter  is real.

Notes

An extensive table of Hilbert transforms is available.
Note that the Hilbert transform of a constant is zero.

Domain of definition
It is by no means obvious that the Hilbert transform is well-defined at all, as the improper integral defining it must converge in a suitable sense.

exists for almost every . That is,

In the case , the Hilbert transform still converges pointwise almost everywhere, but may itself fail to be integrable, even locally. In particular, convergence in the mean does not in general happen in this case.

Properties

Boundedness

for all 

The best constant  is given by

An easy way to find the best  for  being a power of 2 is through the so-called Cotlar's identity that  for all real valued . The same best constants hold for the periodic Hilbert transform.

The boundedness of the Hilbert transform implies the  convergence of the symmetric partial sum operator 

Anti-self adjointness
Symbolically,

Inverse transform
The Hilbert transform is an anti-involution, meaning that

provided each transform is well-defined.

Complex structure
Because   ("" is the identity operator) on the real Banach space of real-valued functions in  the Hilbert transform defines a linear complex structure on this Banach space. In particular, when , the Hilbert transform gives the Hilbert space of real-valued functions in  the structure of a complex Hilbert space.

The (complex) eigenstates of the Hilbert transform admit representations as holomorphic functions in the upper and lower half-planes in the Hardy space  by the Paley–Wiener theorem.

Differentiation
Formally, the derivative of the Hilbert transform is the Hilbert transform of the derivative, i.e. these two linear operators commute:

Iterating this identity,

Convolutions
The Hilbert transform can formally be realized as a convolution with the tempered distribution

Thus formally,

However, a priori this may only be defined for  a distribution of compact support. Alternatively, one may use the fact that h(t) is the distributional derivative of the function ; to wit

For most operational purposes the Hilbert transform can be treated as a convolution. For example, in a formal sense, the Hilbert transform of a convolution is the convolution of the Hilbert transform applied on only one of either of the factors:

By passing to an appropriate limit, it is thus also true if  and  provided that

from a theorem due to Titchmarsh.

Invariance
 It commutes with translations.  That is, it commutes with the operators  for all  in 
 It commutes with positive dilations.  That is it commutes with the operators  for all .
 It anticommutes with the reflection .

Up to a multiplicative constant, the Hilbert transform is the only bounded operator on 2 with these properties.

In fact there is a wider set of operators that commute with the Hilbert transform. The group  acts by unitary operators  on the space  by the formula

This unitary representation is an example of a principal series representation of  In this case it is reducible, splitting as the orthogonal sum of two invariant subspaces, Hardy space  and its conjugate. These are the spaces of  boundary values of holomorphic functions on the upper and lower halfplanes.  and its conjugate consist of exactly those  functions with Fourier transforms vanishing on the negative and positive parts of the real axis respectively. In other words,  commutes with the operators .

Extending the domain of definition

Hilbert transform of distributions
It is further possible to extend the Hilbert transform to certain spaces of distributions .

This is accomplished by the duality pairing:
For  define:

It is possible to define the Hilbert transform on the space of tempered distributions as well by an approach due to Gel'fand and Shilov, but considerably more care is needed because of the singularity in the integral.

Hilbert transform of bounded functions 
Properly understood, the Hilbert transform maps  to the Banach space of bounded mean oscillation (BMO) classes.

Interpreted naïvely, the Hilbert transform of a bounded function is clearly ill-defined. To alleviate such difficulties, the Hilbert transform of an  function is therefore defined by the following regularized form of the integral

where as above  and

The modified transform  agrees with the original transform up to an additive constant on functions of compact support from a general result by Calderón and Zygmund. Furthermore, the resulting integral converges pointwise almost everywhere, and with respect to the BMO norm, to a function of bounded mean oscillation.

A deep result of Fefferman's work is that a function is of bounded mean oscillation if and only if it has the form  for some

Conjugate functions
The Hilbert transform can be understood in terms of a pair of functions  and  such that the function

is the boundary value of a holomorphic function  in the upper half-plane.

Suppose that  Then, by the theory of the Poisson integral,  admits a unique harmonic extension into the upper half-plane, and this extension is given by

Furthermore, there is a unique harmonic function  defined in the upper half-plane such that  is holomorphic and

Thus

Indeed, the real and imaginary parts of the Cauchy kernel are

so that  is holomorphic by Cauchy's integral formula.

Thus, succinctly,

Titchmarsh's theorem 

Titchmarsh's theorem (named for E. C. Titchmarsh who included it in his 1937 work) makes precise the relationship between the boundary values of holomorphic functions in the upper half-plane and the Hilbert transform. It gives necessary and sufficient conditions for a complex-valued square-integrable function  on the real line to be the boundary value of a function in the Hardy space  of holomorphic functions in the upper half-plane .

The theorem states that the following conditions for a complex-valued square-integrable function  are equivalent:

Specifically, if  is a holomorphic function such that

Furthermore,

This is not true in the case . In fact, the Hilbert transform of an  function  need not converge in the mean to another  function. Nevertheless, the Hilbert transform of  does converge almost everywhere to a finite function  such that

This result is directly analogous to one by Andrey Kolmogorov for Hardy functions in the disc. Although usually called Titchmarsh's theorem, the result aggregates much work of others, including Hardy, Paley and Wiener (see Paley–Wiener theorem), as well as work by Riesz, Hille, and Tamarkin

Riemann–Hilbert problem 

Two functions of this form are a solution of the Riemann–Hilbert problem.

Formally, if  solve the Riemann–Hilbert problem

Hilbert transform on the circle 

For a periodic function  the circular Hilbert transform is defined:

The circular Hilbert transform is used in giving a characterization of Hardy space and in the study of the conjugate function in Fourier series. The kernel, 

is known as the Hilbert kernel since it was in this form the Hilbert transform was originally studied.

The Hilbert kernel (for the circular Hilbert transform) can be obtained by making the Cauchy kernel  periodic. More precisely, for 

Many results about the circular Hilbert transform may be derived from the corresponding results for the Hilbert transform from this correspondence.

Another more direct connection is provided by the Cayley transform , which carries the real line onto the circle and the upper half plane onto the unit disk. It induces a unitary map

of  onto  The operator  carries the Hardy space  onto the Hardy space .

Hilbert transform in signal processing

Bedrosian's theorem 
Bedrosian's theorem states that the Hilbert transform of the product of a low-pass and a high-pass signal with non-overlapping spectra is given by the product of the low-pass signal and the Hilbert transform of the high-pass signal, or

A category of communication signals to which this applies is called the narrowband signal model. A member of that category is amplitude modulation of a high-frequency sinusoidal "carrier":

where  is the narrow bandwidth "message" waveform, such as voice or music.  Then by Bedrosian's theorem:

Analytic representation 

A specific type of conjugate function is:

known as the analytic representation of   The name reflects its mathematical tractability, due largely to Euler's formula.  Applying Bedrosian's theorem to the narrowband model, the analytic representation is:

In that case, the imaginary part of the result is a Hilbert transform of the real part. This is an indirect way to produce Hilbert transforms.

Angle (phase/frequency) modulation 
The form:

is called angle modulation, which includes both phase modulation and frequency modulation. The instantaneous frequency is    For sufficiently large , compared to 

and:

Single sideband modulation (SSB) 

When  in  is also an analytic representation (of a message waveform), that is:

the result is single-sideband modulation:

whose transmitted component is:

Causality
The function  presents two challenges to practical implementation as a convolution:
 Its duration is infinite (technically infinite support).  A finite length approximation must be used instead.  But windowing the length also reduces the effective frequency range of the transform.  The shorter the window, the greater the losses at low and high frequencies. See also quadrature filter.
 It is a non-causal filter.  So a delayed version,  is required.  The corresponding output is subsequently delayed by   When creating the imaginary part of an analytic signal, the source (real part) must be delayed by the equivalent amount.

Discrete Hilbert transform 

The inverse DTFT, using the convolution theorem, is:

where

which is an infinite impulse response (IIR). An FIR filter with an odd number of anti-symmetric coefficients is called Type III, which inherently exhibits responses of zero magnitude at frequencies 0 and Nyquist, resulting in this case in a bandpass filter shape. A Type IV design (even number of anti-symmetric coefficients) is shown in Figure 2. Since the magnitude response at the Nyquist frequency does not drop out, it approximates an ideal Hilbert transformer a little better than the odd-tap filter. However
 A typical (i.e. properly filtered and sampled)  sequence has no useful components at the Nyquist frequency.
 The Type IV impulse response requires a  sample shift in the  sequence. That causes the zero-valued coefficients to become non-zero, as seen in Figure 2. So a Type III design is potentially twice as efficient as Type IV.
The group delay of Type IV is halfway between two samples.

The MATLAB function, convolves a u[n] sequence with the periodic summation:

and returns one cycle ( samples) of the periodic result in the imaginary part of a complex-valued output sequence. The convolution is implemented in the frequency domain as the product of the array    with samples of the  distribution (whose real and imaginary components are all just 0 or ). Given an FIR approximation for  denoted by  substituting  for the  samples results in an FIR version of the convolution.

Edge effects prevent the result from being a pure sine function (green plot). Since  is not an FIR sequence, the theoretical extent of the effects is the entire output sequence. But the differences from a sine function diminish with distance from the edges. Parameter  is the output sequence length. If it exceeds the length of the input sequence, the input is modified by appending zero-valued elements. In most cases, that reduces the magnitude of the differences. But their duration is dominated by the inherent rise and fall times of the  impulse response.

An appreciation for the edge effects is important when a method called overlap-save is used to perform the convolution on a long  sequence. Segments of length  are convolved with the periodic function:

Figure 5 is an example of using both the IIR hilbert(·) function and the FIR approximation. In the example, a sine function is created by computing the Discrete Hilbert transform of a cosine function, which was processed in four overlapping segments, and pieced back together. The fact that  is tapered (windowed) is actually helpful in this context. The real problem is that it's not windowed enough. Effectively, whereas the overlap-save method needs .

Number-theoretic Hilbert transform 
The number theoretic Hilbert transform is an extension of the discrete Hilbert transform to integers modulo an appropriate prime number. In this it follows the generalization of discrete Fourier transform to number theoretic transforms. The number theoretic Hilbert transform can be used to generate sets of orthogonal discrete sequences.

See also 
 Analytic signal
 Harmonic conjugate
 Hilbert spectroscopy
 Hilbert transform in the complex plane
 Hilbert–Huang transform
 Kramers–Kronig relation
 Riesz transform
 Single-sideband signal
 Singular integral operators of convolution type

Notes

Page citations

References 

 
 
 
 
 
 
 
 
 
 
 
 
 
 
 
 
 ; also http://www.fuchs-braun.com/media/d9140c7b3d5004fbffff8007fffffff0.pdf

 
 
 
 
 
 
 
 
 
 
 
 
 
 
 
 ; also https://www.dsprelated.com/freebooks/mdft/Analytic_Signals_Hilbert_Transform.html

Further reading

External links 

 Derivation of the boundedness of the Hilbert transform
 Mathworld Hilbert transform — Contains a table of transforms
 
  an entry level introduction to Hilbert transformation.

Harmonic functions
Integral transforms
Signal processing
Singular integrals
Schwartz distributions